The McGowan family is a noble family holding titles in the Peerage of the United Kingdom and the Peerage and Baronetage of Ireland .

Ancestry

Through the current Lord McGowan's maternal grandfather, the family is descended from the Pepys family (the Earls of Cottenham), and the Nevill family, holders of the titles of Marquess of Abergavenny, Viscount Neville and Earl of Abergavenny. This connection names Kings Edward III, Edward IV and Richard III, the last members of the House of York to rule England, among the family's ancestors. This royal ancestry is derived from Cecily Neville, Duchess of York, mother to Edward IV and Richard III. The linked houses of Neville and York were to become renowned for their involvement in the War of the Roses.

King Edward III of England was the paternal Great-Grandfather of Cecily Neville.

Also among the family's ancestors is William Young, the highly regarded architect and Sir James Herbert Cory, Conservative MP and philanthropist.

Baron McGowan
The family's main title is that of Baron McGowan, of Ardeer, with this peerage being held only by the direct descendants of Sir Harry McGowan, 1st Bt, (later Lord McGowan).
The current head of the family is Lord Harry John Charles McGowan, 4th Baron McGowan.

Coat of arms

Family tree

References

Anglo-Irish families
Noble families of the United Kingdom